Tomb Blaster is a dark ride that opened in 2002 at Chessington World of Adventures Resort in London. Riders travel in trains through a series of crypts, shooting laser guns at targets for high scores.

History

Tomb Blaster is a dark ride in the Forbidden Kingdom area of Chessington World of Adventures Resort. It originally opened as The 5th Dimension, a dark ride based on a story of a TV repair robot that operated from 1987 to 1993. The ride system was manufactured by Mack Rides.

The area was rethemed as the Forbidden Kingdom in 1994, and the ride became Terror Tomb, a horror ride in the dark. Terror Tomb (aka "Forbidden Tomb") told the story of a tomb robber named Abdab and the dangers he encountered trying to steal a gem from the tomb. It opened in 1994 and closed in 2001.

In 2002 Tomb Blaster launched as a retheme of the old terror tomb ride utilising many of the sets but with some anamatronics being replaced. In the dark ride riders shoot laser guns at targets.

In August 2015, Tomb Blaster closed for undisclosed reasons. It then underwent a minor refurbishment during the closed season, with a new laser gun system, an ultraviolet scenic treatment and altered audio. The refurbished ride debuted during the annual pass preview weekend of 2016 to a negative response. General response from guests as well as fans of the ride criticised the "unprofessional" nature of the new lighting and audio alterations, citing missing sound effects, many animations still broken, missing pieces of the sets and excessive light spillage that revealed the areas intended to be covered by darkness.

In 2020, the attraction was revamped with a new story overlay, new soundtrack and lighting, with some of the targets removed. The new story for the attraction is that guests are being recruited to rid the tomb of the curse of the high priest.

Description
Anyone under 1.1 meters must be accompanied by an adult.

Riders sit in "utility vehicles" and travel through a tomb, shooting mummies and monsters with laser guns, and competing for top scores. Among the scenes are a crypt, a revolving tunnel, and snake pits. Many of the original set pieces from Terror Tomb remain in the Tomb Blaster ride with the exclusion of the Abdab animatronics.

Incidents
 On 7 June 2012, a four-year-old girl entered a near month-long coma after falling 14 ft from the ride's raised queue line. The queue line's protective wooden fence panelling was both untreated and positioned in an area which was subject to rainwater runoff from a nearby roof. It had over the years become rotten due to weathering. Palings had previously fallen from the fence and had been nailed back into place despite their rotten nature. No formal records of the repairs were kept. A paling from the fence had fallen out on the day of the incident leaving a gap through which the girl fell. Severe injuries occurred, including broken ribs, a cracked skull, and bleeding on the brain. Chessington World of Adventures was fined £150,000 after pleading guilty to breaching the Health and Safety Act (1974).

Gallery

See also
Chessington World of Adventures Resort
Terror Tomb
The 5th Dimension

References

External links

Chessington World of Adventures rides
Tourist attractions in London
Amusement rides introduced in 2002
2002 establishments in the United Kingdom
Dark rides